Lamponidae is a family of spiders first described by Eugène Simon in 1893. It contains about 200 described species in 23 genera, most of which are endemic to Australia, with the genus Centrocalia endemic to New Caledonia, and two Lampona species (L. cylindrata, L. murina) also occurring in New Zealand where it is commonly known as the "White Tail" spider. Lampona papua is endemic to New Guinea, where two otherwise Australian species (Centrothele mutica, Lamponova wau) also occur.

Genera
The categorization into subfamilies follows Joel Hallan's Biology Catalog.

 Centrothelinae Platnick, 2000
 Asadipus Simon, 1897 (Australia)
 Bigenditia Platnick, 2000 (Australia)
 Centrocalia Platnick, 2000 (New Caledonia)
 Centroina Platnick, 2002 (Australia)
 Centrothele L. Koch, 1873 (Australia)
 Centsymplia Platnick, 2000 (Australia)
 Graycassis Platnick, 2000 (Australia)
 Longepi Platnick, 2000 (Australia)
 Notsodipus Platnick, 2000 (Australia)
 Prionosternum Dunn, 1951 (Australia)
 Queenvic Platnick, 2000 (Australia)

 Lamponinae Simon, 1893
 Lampona Thorell, 1869 (Australia)
 Lamponata Platnick, 2000 (Australia)
 Lamponega Platnick, 2000 (Australia)
 Lamponella Platnick, 2000 (Australia)
 Lamponicta Platnick, 2000 (Australia)
 Lamponina Strand, 1913 (Australia)
 Lamponoides Platnick, 2000 (Australia)
 Lamponova Platnick, 2000 (Australia, New Zealand)
 Lamponusa Platnick, 2000 (Australia)
 Platylampona Platnick, 2004 (Australia)

 Pseudolamponinae Platnick, 2000
 Paralampona Platnick, 2000 (Australia)
 Pseudolampona Platnick, 2000 (Australia)

See also
 List of Lamponidae species

References

 A relimitation and revision of the Australasian ground spider family Lamponidae (Araneae, Gnaphosoidea). Bulletin of the AMNH 245. PDF (56Mb) - Abstract

Further reading
 Platnick, N.I. (2004). On a Third Group of Flattened Ground Spiders from Australia (Araneae, Lamponidae). American Museum Novitates 3462. PDF (Platylampona)

External links

 Picture of Lampona cylindrata
 

 
Spiders of Australia
Spiders of New Zealand
Araneomorphae families